The Mugger is a (1956) novel by Ed McBain, the second in his 87th Precinct series. It was adapted for a film of the same name in 1958. In 2002 the author wrote an introduction to this and to his earlier novel Cop Hater when both were published in an omnibus edition.

Plot

A mugger is attacking women in Isola.  Carella is on his honeymoon, and the case is being handled by Detective Hal Willis.  A second plot involves Bert Kling, a patrolman hunting a killer.

Characters

This novel introduces the character of Claire Townsend, Bert Kling's girlfriend (killed in the novel Lady, Lady, I Did It).  Bert gets a promotion to Detective 3rd Grade.  Also introduced in this novel are the characters of Detective 2nd Grade Eileen Burke and homicide detectives Monoghan and Monroe.

1956 American novels
American crime novels
American novels adapted into films
Novels by Evan Hunter
Novels set in New York City